The United States District Court for the Northern District of Illinois (in case citations, N.D. Ill.)  is the federal trial-level court with jurisdiction over the northern counties of Illinois.

Appeals from the Northern District of Illinois are taken to the United States Court of Appeals for the Seventh Circuit (except for patent claims and claims against the U.S. government under the Tucker Act, which are appealed to the Federal Circuit).

The court is divided into two geographical divisions:

The eastern division includes Cook, DuPage, McHenry, Grundy, Kane, Kendall, La Salle, Lake, and Will counties. Its sessions are held in Chicago and Wheaton.

The western division includes Boone, Carroll, De Kalb, Jo Daviess, Lee,  Ogle, Stephenson, Whiteside, and Winnebago. Its sessions are held in Freeport and Rockford.

The United States Attorney for the Northern District of Illinois represents the United States in civil and criminal litigation in the court. The Acting United States Attorney is Morris Pasqual since March 12, 2023.

History 
 The United States District Court for the District of Illinois was established by a statute passed by the United States Congress on March 3, 1819, . The act established a single office for a judge to preside over the court. Initially, the court was not within any existing judicial circuit, and appeals from the court were taken directly to the United States Supreme Court. In 1837, Congress created the United States Court of Appeals for the Seventh Circuit, placing it in Chicago, Illinois and giving it jurisdiction over the District of Illinois, .

The Northern District itself was created by a statute passed on February 13, 1855, which subdivided the District of Illinois into the Northern and the Southern Districts. The boundaries of the District and the seats of the courts were set forth in the statute: 

The district has since been re-organized several times. It was later eliminated in a reorganization on October 2, 1978, which replaced it with a Central District, formed primarily from parts of the Southern District, and returning some counties to the Northern District.

The Northern District of Illinois, which contains the entire Chicago metropolitan area, accounts for 1,531 of the 1,828 public corruption convictions in the state between 1976 and 2012, almost 84%, also making it the federal district with the most public corruption convictions in the nation between 1976 and 2012.

Cases 
It is one of the busiest federal trial courts in the nation. Famous cases have included those of Al Capone and the Chicago Eight.

Current judges 
:

Vacancies and pending nominations

Former judges

Chief judges

Succession of seats

List of U.S. Attorneys since 1857 
 Augustus M. Herrington, 1857–1858
 Henry S. Fitch, 1858–1861
 Edwin C. Larned, 1861
 Joseph O. Glover, 1869 
 Mark Bangs, 1875–1879
 Joseph B. Seake, 1879–1884
 Richard S. Tuthill, 1884–1886 
 William G. Ewing, 1886–1890
 Thomas E. Milchrist, 1891–1893
 Sherwood Dixon, 1893–1894
 John C. Black, 1895–1899
 Solomon H. Bethea, 1899–1905
 Charles B. Morrison, 1905–1906
 Edwin W. Sims, 1906–1911
 James Herbert Wilkerson, 1911–1914
 Charles F. Clyne, 1914–1922
 Edwin A. Olson, 1922–1927
 George E. Q. Johnson, 1927–1931
 Dwight H. Green, 1931–1935
 Michael L. Igoe, 1935–1938
 William Joseph Campbell, 1938–1940
 J. Albert Woll, 1940–1947
 Otto Kerner Jr., 1947–1954
 Irwin N. Cohen, 1954
 Robert Tieken, 1954–1961
 James P. O'Brien, 1961–1963
 Frank E. McDonald, 1963–1964
 Edward Hanrahan, 1964–1968
 Tom Foran, 1968–1970
 William J. Bauer, 1970–1971
 James R. Thompson, 1971–1975
 Samuel K. Skinner, 1975–1977
 Thomas P. Sullivan, 1977–1981
 Gregory C. Jones, 1981
 Dan K. Webb, 1981–1985
 Anton R. Valukas, 1985–1989
 Ira A. Raphaelson, 1989–1990
 Fred Foreman, 1990–1993
 Michael J. Shepard, 1993
 Jim Burns, 1993–1997
 Scott R. Lassar, 1997–2001
 Patrick Fitzgerald, 2001–2012
 Gary S. Shapiro, 2012–2013
 Zachary T. Fardon, 2013–2017
 Joel R. Levin, 2017
 John R. Lausch Jr., 2017–present

See also 
 Courts of Illinois
 List of current United States district judges
 List of United States federal courthouses in Illinois

References

External links 
 
 United States Attorney for the Northern District of Illinois Official Website
 Office of Special Counsel, Northern District of Illinois

Illinois, Northern District
Organizations based in Illinois
1855 establishments in Illinois
Chicago
Rockford, Illinois
Courthouses in Illinois
Courts and tribunals established in 1855